Walton Hall is a stately home in the county of West Yorkshire, England, near Wakefield. It was built in the Palladian style in 1767 on an island within a  lake, on the site of a former moated medieval hall. It was the ancestral home of the naturalist and traveller Charles Waterton,  who made Walton Hall into the world's first wildfowl and nature reserve. Waterton's son, Edmund, sold the estate.

The Waterton Collection is now in Wakefield Museum.

Walton Hall is now part of the Waterton Park Hotel. In the 1940s and again in the early 1950s and early 1960s the Hall was a maternity home.

Walton Hall with his residence at Cawthorne, was home to the Old English (Anglo-Saxon) Chieftain, Ailric, the ancestor of Charles Waterton, who is mentioned in the Domesday Book and was the Kings Thane for South Yorkshire. The day the Normans first came to Yorkshire, Ailric was at Walton Hall and was alerted by a man on horseback that they were coming in force. He hastily amassed his retainers and on horseback they ambushed the mounted Norman knights of Ilbert de Laci, who were moving on the road from Tanshelf to Wakefield. The better armoured and armed knights of Ilbert de Laci were able to drive off this attack. For 2–3 years Ailric was able to maintain a guerrilla war out of his estates in the west of South Yorkshire, until Ilbert was forced to come to an accommodation with him, whereby Ailric would communicate with the local people and Ilbert would grant him back, many of his former estates, including Walton Hall.

The descendant of this family, Sara le Neville, married Thomas De Burgh, the Steward of the Countess of Brittany, Duchess of Richmond. Walton Hall was one of six manors, including the manors at Silkstone and Cawthorne and the De Burgh manors in North Yorkshire, that she lived at through the year. In 1333, Sir Philip de Burgh was granted a licence to 'crenelate' his manor house at Walton.

The Waterton family acquired the Cawthorne estates and those at Walton in which was Walton Hall, with the marriage in 1435 of Constance Asshenhull, the heiress of the De Burgh family, to Richard Waterton.

In the time of Sir Robert Waterton who served King Henry VIII the hall came to the waters edge and was three storeys high. Sir Robert Waterton's father-in-law was Sir Richard Tempest, who was with King Henry VIII at the Field of the Cloth of Gold. His father in law was also Steward of the King's manor of Wakefield and involved in the Tempest - Saville feud. The only part of the old buildings that remain is the old watergate, which is said to be part of an earlier 14th century structure. At that time it was the only entrance to be made, across a lowered drawbridge. The old oak hall referred to by Charles Waterton was on the second storey and was in an L shape.

The entrance hall at Walton Hall still has armorial shields on the walls that represent the ancestors of the Waterton family at Walton Hall. The Waterton family intermarried with other prominent Yorkshire families of the medieval age, including the Percys, the Barnbys, the Wentworths, the Hildyards and others.

Walton Hall is a proposed UNESCO World Heritage Site.  Sir David Attenborough has stated that “Walton Hall is an extremely important site in the history of nature conservation worldwide.  It is, arguably, the first tract of land anywhere in modern times to be protected, guarded and maintained as a nature reserve.”

Walton Hall sundial

There is a sundial located on the island to the rear of Walton Hall. It was made by George Boulby in 1813 and is made out of an ashlar with copper gnomons. It is a multi-faceted sundial made out of a polyhedron. It indicates the time in the following cities around the world: Amsterdam, Basle, Boston, Demerara, Madras, Madrid, Mexico City, Moscow, Beijing, Philadelphia, Rome, and Warsaw.
It was described by Richard Hobson thus:
"On the southern side of the mansion, on a slightly elevated mound, stands a most complete and very beautiful sun-dial, deserving of careful observation, inasmuch as it reflects a great credit on the sculptor, the late George Boulby, who was a common mason at the contiguous and rural village of Crofton, in 1813. A work of art, and, especially when it was well known to have been executed by a totally uneducated man - by a common mason, not only devoid of inculcated literary attainments, but by one having had no guiding artistic instruction - by a man having to earn, 'by the sweat of his brow', the few shillings sufficient to enable him to secure some of the works of the philosopher of Athens - by one having to entirely depend upon self counsel so as to elevate him in his financial and social position. I venture to say, considering all these formidable disadvantages and impediments, that this specimen of sculpture is a wonderful development of innate talent, and must be admired and applauded, for generations in futurity, as a relic of the excellence of the scientific execution of the common stone mason.

"This dial is composed of twenty equilateral triangles, which are so disposed as to form a similar number of individual dials, ten of which, whenever the sun shines out, and whatever may be its altitude in the heavens, are always in use, and ever faithful time-keepers. On these separate dials are engraven, severally, the names of cities in all parts of the globe, which are placed in accordance with their different degrees of longitude, by which arrangement, the solar time, at each of the cities recorded on the different dials, can be simultaneously ascertained.

"On one occasion Mr. Waterton, having to pass Boulby's house ... saw this dial in the stonemason's yard, for which Boulby asked a mere trifle. The Squire, delighted with the execution and the ingenuity of this simple-minded man, generously presented Boulby with twenty guineas by way of purchase, when the ingenuous and unaffected mason was infinitely more delighted to have the honour of his own artistic skills exhibited at Walton Hall, under the patronage of the Squire, than with the douceur which the sculptor erroneously considered far beyond its value"
Charles Waterton: His Home, Habits and Handiwork. Reminiscences of an Intimate and Most Confiding Personal Association for Nearly Thirty Years, by Richard Hobson MD. (1866/7)

See also
Listed buildings in Walton, Wakefield

References

External links

 Overtown Miscellany - Walton & Squire Waterton

Country houses in West Yorkshire
Buildings and structures in Wakefield
Houses completed in 1767
1767 establishments in England
Hall